Mikhail Ivanov (born 24 September 1965) is a Soviet rower. He won a gold medal at the 1986 World Rowing Championships in Nottingham with the men's quadruple sculls.

References

1965 births
Living people
Soviet male rowers
World Rowing Championships medalists for the Soviet Union